Albuzzano (Lombard: Albüssan) is a comune (municipality) in the Province of Pavia in the Italian region of Lombardy, located about 30 km south of Milan and about 9 km east of Pavia. As of 31 December 2004, it had a population of 2,500 and an area of 15.3 km2.

The municipality of Albuzzano contains the frazioni (subdivisions, mainly villages and hamlets) Barona, Cascina De Mensi, Alperolo, Torre d'Astari, and Vigalfo.

Albuzzano borders the following municipalities: Belgioioso, Cura Carpignano, Filighera, Linarolo, Valle Salimbene, Vistarino.

Demographic evolution

References

External links 
 www.comune.albuzzano.pv.it/

Cities and towns in Lombardy
Articles which contain graphical timelines